Soudah (Arabic: ٱلسّوْدَة), is a mountainous area in the Asir region of Saudi Arabia. At 3,015 metres (9,893 ft) above sea level, the area is known for its dense juniper tree covered mountains. 

The area is currently experiencing sustainable development undertaken by the Public Investment Fund (PIF) owned Soudah Development Company (SDC). SDC aims to drive the development of Soudah and parts of Rijal Alma’a Governate to create a luxury mountain destination through investment in the infrastructure, advancing the entertainment, residential and commercial sectors, while increasing access to its unique culture, national treasures and heritage sites.

Climate
The climate of Soudah is moderate throughout the year with temperatures rarely exceeding 25 °C (77 °F) in the summer and not rising to more than 15 °C (59 °F) in the winter. Due to Soudah's altitude, the climate is around 10 °C (18 °F) cooler than the rest of Saudi Arabia.  

Overall, the area enjoys a cool variation of semi-arid climate (BSk) that borders a regionally rare warm-summer Mediterranean climate (Csb) due to the presence of a brief yet unnoticeable wet season that lasts from February to April.

Tourism
The town is a tourist center, and has a cable car to the top of the mountain. Some people in the area claim to have seen snow fall in more than one season per year.

culture 
Soudah has a distinct culture, geography and its verdant nature that differs slightly from other parts of Saudi Arabia. The dress of the region is unique, traditionally women in Soudah have been known to wear colourful headbands and the men flower head wreaths.

Soudah Season 
Soudah Season is a part of the Saudi Seasons initiative. In 2019, Soudah Season took place in July and its activities were implemented in the Soudah highlands, forests and cultural and historical places.

See also
 'Asir Region

References

Populated places in 'Asir Province